Professor Andre Thorton (real name Truett Hudson; also known as The Professor) is a fictional character appearing in American comic books published by Marvel Comics. He is an enemy of Wolverine and had a hand in his origin as part of the Weapon X Project.

Publication history
Professor Thorton first appeared in Marvel Comics Presents #73 and was created by Barry Windsor-Smith.

Fictional character biography
In 1972, nearly twenty years before Logan was romantically involved and abducted with Silver Fox at Windsor snow lodge, Professor Thorton experimented on numerous mutants including Sabretooth and Mastodon. He hired Carol Hines as his assistant and the scientist Abraham Cornelius. His experiments on Wolverine are responsible for his adamantium-laced skeleton. He is also connected to the creation of Alpha Flight on to developing super-soldiers for the US government. During the adamantium-lacing process, the physical trauma causes Wolverine to regress to violent animal behavior, prone to attacking anyone who comes near. At one point, Thorton's mysterious "master" takes control of Wolverine and has him attack everyone in the facility, cutting off Professor Thorton's right hand and killing him. Though an ending scene clarifies to the reader that this was a virtual reality simulation of an escape attempt by Wolverine, in later appearances Thorton has a metal hook in place of his right hand.

Years later, Professor Thorton and Carol Hines lure Wolverine into an abandoned warehouse in Canada which was once the secret location for the Weapon X program. Codenamed Project X, Wolverine discovers Weapon X was funded by the CIA and sheltered in Canada. Professor Thorton activates a robotic android named Shiva which is programmed to destroy all of Project X's test subjects starting with Wolverine. Silver Fox (who works for another secret organization called HYDRA) is revealed to be behind the entire plan and steps forward to interrogate Professor Thorton at gunpoint. He tries to grab the gun from Silver Fox and she shoots him fatally.

It was shown that Romulus was in control of Weapon X and gave orders to Truett both observing Wolverine as he was unconscious. Although it is stated that Romulus had known Logan in a past life, it is unclear if he knew of Logan while he was young and living at the Howlett estate if this he did then he would have known of Truett's connection to Logan.

Other versions
 A version of the Professor (although insane) appears in the pages of Mutant X, but is killed by Captain America.
 In a What If issue that asks "What If Logan Battled Weapon X", Professor Thorton was present when former Mountee and Marine Guy Desjardins went through the Adamantium-bonding process after the Weapon X soldiers failed to capture Logan.
 The Professor appears in Wolverine: The End in a flashback. He was not killed by Silver Fox and is living out his rich days on an unknown beach.

In other media

Television
 Professor Oyama (an amalgamation of Lord Dark Wind and Thornton) first appears in the X-Men episode "Repo Man", then later in reused footage from this episode in the two-parter "Out of Time". He also appears in "Weapon X, Lies & Videotape". His voice actor was uncredited.
 Professor Thorton appears in the X-Men: Evolution episode "Grim Reminder", voiced by Campbell Lane.
 Professor Thorton appears in Wolverine and the X-Men, episode "Past Discretions" voiced by Tom Kane.
 Tom Kane reprises his role of Professor Thorton who appears in The Avengers: Earth's Mightiest Heroes episode "Behold...The Vision". He is the head at a Weapon X facility when the Vision attacks looking for Adamantium for Ultron.

Film 
 Professor Thorton appeared in the Wolverine portion of Hulk Vs, voiced by Tom Kane. In the film, Thorton plans to have the Weapon X scientists brainwash Hulk and make him a part of Weapon X's Team X which consisted of Sabretooth, Deadpool, Lady Deathstrike, and Omega Red. He was present when Wolverine was also captured and announced that he will have the Weapon X scientists erase his memories again. Professor Thorton is later slashed in the back by Sabretooth.

Video games
 Professor Thorton appeared in X2: Wolverine's Revenge, voiced by Don Morrow. After Weapon X breaks free following the Adamantium-bonding procedure, he confronts Professor Thorton restraining him at claw-point while telling Abraham Cornelius and Carol Hines to take their leave. Professor Thorton reveals that all Weapon X subjects were implanted with a dormant and deadly virus known as the "Shiva Strain" as a failsafe. He also reveals that the virus would kill a normal human in one year, but has no idea how long the virus would kill a human mutant. Professor Thorton isn't seen again after that scene.
 Professor Thorton appeared in X-Men: Legends, voiced by Earl Boen (though the credits listed him as "Doctor"). He is seen in Wolverine's flashback level which depicted Wolverine escaping from the Weapon X facility.

References

External links
 Professor Thorton at Marvel Wiki
 Professor Thorton at Comic Vine

Comics characters introduced in 1991
Marvel Comics scientists
Marvel Comics supervillains
Fictional Canadian people
Characters created by Barry Windsor-Smith
Fictional amputees
X-Men supporting characters